Rio Novo may refer to the following places and rivers in Brazil:

Places
 Rio Novo do Sul, Espírito Santo
 Rio Novo, Minas Gerais

Rivers
 Novo River (Anauá River)
 Novo River (Coxim River)
 Novo River (Espírito Santo)
 Novo River (Iriri River)
 Novo River (Jamanxim River)
 Novo River (Matupiri)
 Novo River (Minas Gerais)
 Novo River (Paraguay River)
 Novo River (Paranapanema River)
 Novo River (Pardo River)
 Novo River (Rondônia)
 Novo River (Santa Catarina)
 Novo River (Xeriuini River)

See also 
 , a canal in Venice, Italy